Tim Declercq (born 21 March 1989 in Leuven) is a Belgian cyclist, who currently rides for UCI WorldTeam . His brother Benjamin was also a professional cyclist before retiring at the end of 2022.

Declerq is known to be a powerful rider who generally acts as a domestique. He earned the nickname "El Tractor" due to his frequent work riding at the front of the peloton. A 2020 poll of riders in the professional peloton by cyclingnews.com named Declercq as the best domestique in the world.

Major results

2007
 1st Stage 1 Münsterland Giro
2011
 1st  Road race, National Under-23 Road Championships
 Ronde van Namen
1st Stages 2 & 5
2012
 1st Internationale Wielertrofee Jong Maar Moedig
 6th Coppa Bernocchi
 10th Ronde van Zeeland Seaports
2013
 1st Internationale Wielertrofee Jong Maar Moedig
 4th Overall Le Triptyque des Monts et Châteaux
 7th Tour du Finistère
 9th Schaal Sels-Merksem
2016
 7th Dwars door het Hageland
 7th Schaal Sels-Merksem
 8th Le Samyn
2017
 3rd Gullegem Koerse
2019
 1st  Mountains classification, Volta ao Algarve
 7th Le Samyn
2020
 2nd Three Days of Bruges–De Panne
 5th Omloop Het Nieuwsblad
 9th Le Samyn
2022
 4th Overall Saudi Tour

Grand Tour general classification results timeline

References

External links

1989 births
Living people
Belgian male cyclists
Sportspeople from Leuven
Cyclists from Flemish Brabant